Cratognathus is a genus of beetles in the family Carabidae, containing the following species:

 Cratognathus alluaudi Basilewsky, 1946
 Cratognathus capensis Laporte de Castelnau, 1835
 Cratognathus grandiceps Boheman, 1860
 Cratognathus mandibularis Dejean, 1829
 Cratognathus straneoi Basilewsky, 1948

References

Harpalinae
Carabidae genera
Beetles of Africa
Taxa named by Pierre François Marie Auguste Dejean